Royal Children is a 1950 West German comedy film directed by Helmut Käutner and starring Jenny Jugo, Peter van Eyck and Hedwig Wangel.

It was shot at the Bavaria Studios in Munich and on location in Bad Wimpfen and at Hornberg Castle. The film's sets were designed by the art director Bruno Monden and Hermann Warm. It was a major commercial failure on release.

Synopsis
At the end of the Second World War, part of the traditional royal family are forced to flee from their historic lands. They still possess a castle in Bavaria. After a difficult journey to reach it they find that the castle is in ruins. Gradually they try to rebuild their lives in their new home and adjust to the challenges of modern life.

Cast
 Jenny Jugo as Prinzessin Ulrike von Brandenburg
 Peter van Eyck as Paul König
 Hedwig Wangel as Frau von Bockh, Oberhofmeisterin
 Erika von Thellmann as Yella von Beuthel, Hofdame der Prinzessin
 Thea Thiele as Felizitas, Herzogin von Lauenstein
 Friedrich Schoenfelder as Prinz Alexander 'Sascha' von Thessalien
 Walter Kottenkamp as Achilles, Prinz von Brandenburg, Onkel von Ulrike
 Theodor Danegger as Hubertus, Herzog von Lauenstein
 Georg Vogelsang as Daun
 Rudolf Schündler as Tintsch
 Charles Regnier as Graf Larissa
 Beppo Brem as Landrat
 Wastl Witt as Forstmeister
 Bob Norwood
 Gertrud Wolle as Lehrerin
 Barbara Gallauner as Sekretärin
 Beppo Schwaiger as Karl
 Marion Kässl
 Helmut Käutner as German policeman
 Franz Loskarn

References

Bibliography 
 Hans-Michael Bock and Tim Bergfelder. The Concise Cinegraph: An Encyclopedia of German Cinema. Berghahn Books.
 Davidson, John & Hake, Sabine. Framing the Fifties: Cinema in a Divided Germany. Berghahn Books, 2007.

External links 
 

1950 films
West German films
German comedy films
1950 comedy films
1950s German-language films
Films directed by Helmut Käutner
Bavaria Film films
Films shot at Bavaria Studios
Films set in Bavaria
German black-and-white films
1950s German films